Cullin-associated NEDD8-dissociated protein 1 is a protein that in humans is encoded by the CAND1 gene.

Interactions 

CAND1 has been shown to interact with:

 CUL1, 
 CUL2,
 CUL3, 
 CUL4A, 
 CUL4B, 
 DCUN1D1, and
 RBX1.

References

External links

Further reading